The following is a timeline of the history of the city of Valencia, Spain.

Prior to 20th century

 137 BCE - Foundation of Valentia Edetanorum es by the Romans.
 413 - Taken by the Visigoths.
 714 - Taken by Moors.
 1010 CE - City becomes capital of the Taifa of Valencia.
 1021 -  Independent Moorish kingdom of Valencia was established
 1064 CE - Al-Mamun of Toledo in power.
 1094 - Castilian Rodrigo Díaz de Vivar in power.
 1109 - Almoravid Masdali in power.
 1238 - City becomes capital of the Aragonese Kingdom of Valencia.
 1261 - Furs of Valencia (law) promulgated.
 1262 - Valencia Cathedral construction begins.
 1283 - Consulate of the Sea established.
 1349 - Torres de Serranos (gate) built.
 1380 - Public clock installed (approximate date).
 1444 - Torres de Cuarto es (gate) built.
 1459 - Valencia Cathedral lengthened in its original Gothic style.
 1473 - Printing press in use.
 1474 - "Poetical contest" held.
 1483 - Llotja de la Seda construction begins.
 1499 - University of Valencia founded.
 1568 - Juan de Ribera becomes Archbishop of Valencia.
 1707 - Bourbons in power.
 1776 -  established.
 1812 - 9 January: City taken by French forces es and the  library robbed of its 60,000 volumes.
 1840 - Domingo Mascarós es becomes mayor.
 1858 - Plaza de Toros de Valencia opens.
 1887 - Population: 170,763.
 1897 - Population: 204,768.

20th century

 1913 - Museu de Belles Arts de València established.
 1915 - Teatro Olympia es opens.
 1917 - Estació del Nord (railway station) opens.
 1930 - Population: 320,195.
 1933
 December: "Anarchist uprising es."
 Valencia Airport built.
 1937 - The city becomes the capital of the Republican controlled Spain.
 1940 - Population: 450,756.
 1946 - Cine Majestic (cinema) opens.
 1957 - October: 1957 Valencia flood.
 1958 - Adolfo Rincón de Arellano Garcia becomes mayor.
 1970 - Population: 653,690.
 1984 - Cofrentes Nuclear Power Plant commissioned in region of city of Valencia.
 1988 - Ferrocarrils de la Generalitat Valenciana (railway) begins operating.
 1989 - Institut Valencià d'Art Modern opens.
 1991 - Rita Barberá Nolla becomes mayor.
 1995
 Metrovalencia in operation.
 Eduardo Zaplana becomes president of the regional Generalitat Valenciana government.

21st century

 2006 - 3 July: Valencia Metro derailment (43 dead)
 2010 - Valenbisi bikeshare begins operating.
 2013 - Population: 792,303.
 2015 - Valencia City Council election, 2015 held; Joan Ribó elected mayor.

See also
 Valencia history
 History of Valencia
 

Other cities in the autonomous Valencian Community:(es)
 Timeline of Alicante

References

This article incorporates information from the Spanish Wikipedia.

Bibliography

Published in the 19th century
 
 
 

Published in the 20th century

External links

 Map of Valencia, 1943
 Europeana. Items related to Valencia, various dates.
 Digital Public Library of America. Items related to Valencia, various dates

History of Valencia
valencia